Nicolai Melchiorsen (born 9 March 1984) is a Danish professional football midfielder.

External links

National team profile
Official Danish Superliga stats

1984 births
Living people
Danish men's footballers
Akademisk Boldklub players
Lyngby Boldklub players
Viborg FF players
Danish Superliga players
Association football midfielders